Chuck Clegg is a former American collegiate soccer coach. From 1982 to 1999, he served as the longtime head men's soccer coach at San Diego State University. In 18 seasons, he compiled a 194-134-19 record at the helm. He coached the 1987 team to the National championship game. He led the program to four NCAA tournament appearances in eighteen seasons. From 1989 to 2002, he coached the San Diego State women's soccer team. He posted a 115-71-6 record with that squad. He played college soccer at San Diego State from 1974 to 1976.

References

San Diego State Aztecs men's soccer coaches
San Diego State Aztecs men's soccer players
Year of birth missing (living people)
Living people
San Diego State Aztecs women's soccer coaches
Association footballers not categorized by position
American soccer coaches
Association football players not categorized by nationality